Geoffroy's saddle-back tamarin (Leontocebus nigrifrons) is a species of saddle-back tamarin, a type of small monkey from South America.  Geoffroy's saddle-back tamarin was formerly considered to be a subspecies of the brown-mantled tamarin, L. fuscicollis.  It lives in Loreto, Peru.

It lives in groups with multiple males and females.  It reaches sexual maturity at 18 months.  Both males and females emigrate from their natal group.  Geoffroy's saddle-back tamarin frequently associates with and forms mixed groups with moustached tamarins, Saguinus mystax.  The two species often sleep in the same tree and both species respond to each other's alarm calls.

Its diet consists of fruits, gums, nectar, insects and other small animals.

The IUCN rates it as least concern from a conservation standpoint.

References

Leontocebus
Taxa named by Isidore Geoffroy Saint-Hilaire
Mammals described in 1850